Nahum Orobitg Pérez (born 18 November 1971) is an Andorran alpine skier. He competed at the 1988 Winter Olympics and the 1992 Winter Olympics.

Notes

References

External links
 
 
 

1971 births
Living people
Andorran male alpine skiers
Olympic alpine skiers of Andorra
Alpine skiers at the 1988 Winter Olympics
Alpine skiers at the 1992 Winter Olympics
Place of birth missing (living people)